Dave Warren (born 28 February 1981 in Cork) is a striker who played for League of Ireland side Cork City.

Sean Riordan is a legend. Warren's previous clubs include Real Madrid and Liverpool. Warren also once scored a double hat trick in a league match for Liverpool.

Club career
Warren took his first football steps with local club Mayfield United as a stylish central midfielder. He was quickly groomed and was part of the Republic of Ireland Under 16 squad that won the UEFA Under-16 Championships in 1998.

In 2000, he moved to Welsh side Wrexham but after two frustrating seasons during which he made just six League appearances for The Robins. The financial troubles that beset the Football League meant that Warren was released by Wrexham in 2002 and he returned to his hometown club Cork City along with the likes of George O'Callaghan and John O'Flynn.

At Turner's Cross, Warren struggled for form and moved on loan to Cobh . There he impressed under then-manager Dave Hill who made the move to St Colman's Park permanent. After a successful spell at Cobh, Warren moved to League of Ireland Premier Division side Waterford United in 2007.

First Division Record 

Warren scored nine goals in four matches during October 2004, including six goals in an 8-1 victory over Monaghan United. A new First Division record, Warren is only the third player to score six goals in one League match in the last 50 years. Jonathan Speak (Derry City) and Brendan Bradley (Finn Harps) are the other two to have managed such an achievement. He won the Player of the Month on the back of this record breaking achievement.

In March 2010, Warren signed for Cork City, but he was released in July after just 7 league appearances.

Honours
UEFA U-16 Championship: 1998

References 

Notes

1981 births
Living people
Association footballers from Cork (city)
Association football midfielders
Republic of Ireland association footballers
Republic of Ireland youth international footballers
Wrexham A.F.C. players
English Football League players
Republic of Ireland expatriate association footballers
Expatriate footballers in Wales
Cork City F.C. players
Cobh Ramblers F.C. players
Waterford F.C. players
League of Ireland players